Fortescue is a rural locality in the local government area of Tasman in the South-east region of Tasmania. The 2016 census determined a population of nil for the state suburb of Fortescue.

History
Fortescue is a confirmed suburb/locality.

Geography
The shore of the Tasman Sea is the eastern boundary. Part of Tasman National Park is within the locality.

Road infrastructure
The C344 route (Fortescue Road) enters from the west and runs through to the south-east, where it ends.

References

Localities of Tasman Council
Towns in Tasmania